Barbodes quinquemaculatus is a species of freshwater ray-finned fish from the carp and minnow family, Cyprinidae which is found in the Philippines. The type specimen was taken near Zamboanga.

References

Barbodes
Freshwater fish of the Philippines
Endemic fauna of the Philippines
Fish described in 1907